Antimima eendornensis is a species of plant in the family Aizoaceae. It is endemic to Namibia.  Its natural habitats are subtropical or tropical dry shrubland and rocky areas. It is threatened by habitat loss.

References

Flora of Namibia
eendornensis
Vulnerable plants
Taxonomy articles created by Polbot
Taxa named by Kurt Dinter